The following is a timeline of the history of London in the 21st century, the capital of England and the United Kingdom.

Timeline
London's timeline in the 21st century.

2000 to 2009 
 2000
 1 January: The Millennium Dome opens to the public on the Greenwich Peninsula.
 25 February: 8-year-old Victoria Climbié is murdered after she was tortured and neglect by her guardians, her aunt Marie Therese Kouao and Kouao's partner Carl Manning; Brent and Haringey social services departments will be severely criticised for their shortcomings in the case.
 8 March: Peckham Library opens, and it is awarded the 2000 Stirling Prize.
 9 March: The London Eye ferris wheel opens to the public.
 22 April: Big Number Change: The STD codes 0171 and 0181 codes are replaced with 020 for the whole London telephone area.
 1 May: The May Day riot in central London takes place by anti-capitalist protestors, where the statue of Winston Churchill in Parliament Square and the Cenotaph in Whitehall are daubed with graffiti.
 4 May: In the 2000 London mayoral election: Ken Livingstone, who is standing as an independent, becomes the first directly elected Mayor of London.
 11 May: Croydon Tramlink opens to public, which is the first tram network in London since 1952. They then become part of Transport for London (TfL) in 2008.
 12 May: The Tate Modern art museum opens in the former Bankside Power Station.
 10 June: Millennium Bridge opens to pedestrians, but it is closed after a few days for adaptation due to synchronous lateral excitation.
 3 July: The directly elected Greater London Authority is formed with Ken Livingstone as the Mayor of London. Transport for London is created as a functional body of the GLA and takes over the functions of London Regional Transport, the Public Carriage Office, traffic management and London River Services.
 20 July: Rioting breaks out in Brixton following the fatal shooting of Derek Bennett, a 29-year-old black man, by armed police in the area. 27 people are arrested, and 3 police officers are injured.
 7 November: Millennium Dome raid: The theft of £350 million worth of diamonds from the Millennium Dome is foiled by police.
 27 November: Damilola Taylor, a 10-year-old schoolboy originally from Nigeria, is stabbed to death on his way home from school in Peckham.
 ExCeL London exhibition centre opens at Royal Victoria Dock.
 2001
 4 March: 2001 BBC bombing: A Real Irish Republican Army car bomb explodes outside BBC Television Centre in White City.
 3 August: 2001 Ealing bombing: A Real IRA car bomb explodes in Ealing Broadway.
 21 September: The torso of a 7-year old Nigerian boy, "Adam", who is believed to be the victim of ritual sacrifice, is found in the Thames.
 8 November: The Handel House Museum in Brook Street opens.
 The Citigroup Centre is completed.
 The Conservatoire for Dance and Drama, which is a national higher education institution, is established, the founding affiliates being the Royal Academy of Dramatic Art and the London Contemporary Dance School. Trinity College of Music moves to part of the Old Royal Naval College premises at Greenwich.
 2002
 2 January: The Royal National Lifeboat Institution stations inland rescue boats on the Thames in London, at Teddington, Chiswick and Tower.
 9 April: The funeral procession of Queen Elizabeth The Queen Mother ends at Westminster Abbey after she dies on 30 March at the age of 101.
 May: First Idea Store community centre opens in Bow.
 June: The Golden Jubilee of Elizabeth II takes place.
 July: City Hall, which is the original headquarters of the Greater London Authority and designed by Norman Foster, opens beside the Thames in Southwark.
 3 July: A man decapitates a statue of former Prime Minister Margaret Thatcher on display at Guildhall Art Gallery.
 1 August: London Metropolitan University is formed by merger of London Guildhall University and the University of North London.
 2 September: 8 Canada Square begins to be used by HSBC staff.
 BedZED (Beddington Zero Energy Development), the country's first large-scale zero energy housing development, of 99 homes in Beddington, designed by Bill Dunster, is completed.
 The last complete vehicle, a Ford Fiesta, leaves the Ford Dagenham production line.
 2003
 5 February: There's arrests in the alleged Wood Green ricin plot.
 15 February 2003 anti-war protest: More than 2 million people demonstrate against the Iraq War, making it the largest demonstration in British history.
 17 February: The Congestion Charge is introduced.
 30 March: Gurdwara Sri Guru Singh Sabha Sikh temple opens in Southall.
 May: Transport for London sets up a Directorate of Traffic Operations to run road traffic management (including London Streets Traffic Control Centre), with some functions being transferred from the Metropolitan Police.
 31 May: Post Office Railway carries its last mail.
 10 August: The hottest day until 2022 in London is recorded, where it reaches 38.1°C (100.6°F) in Royal Botanic Gardens, Kew.
 3 October: Baitul Futuh Mosque, Britain's largest, is inaugurated in Morden.
 Redevelopment of Trafalgar Square is completed, the management of the central area becomes a responsibility of the Mayor of London, and the feeding of pigeons here is prohibited.
 The old Wembley Stadium is demolished, and the rubble from it is used to build the hills at Northala Fields in Northolt (Borough of Ealing).
 2004
 10 February: The London Plan is published.
 1 April: The Metropolitan Police takes over policing of The Royal Parks in Greater London from the Royal Parks Constabulary, which is formally dissolved in 2005.
 28 April: The landmark Swiss Re office building ("The Gherkin") at 30 St Mary Axe in the city, which is designed by Norman Foster, opens.
 May: BBC Media Village opens in White City.
 11 May: The University of the Arts London is formed from the London Institute.
 July: The London Stock Exchange moves to Paternoster Square.
 September: The Daniel Gonzalez spree killings take place.
 October: The South London gangs Ghetto Boys and Peckham Boys have a shootout outside the Urban Music Awards in the Barbican Centre.
 10 November: Temple Bar reinstalled in central London at Paternoster Square.
 Pride London is established.
 2005
 6 July: The successful London bid for the 2012 Summer Olympics is announced.
 7 July 2005 London bombings: 56 people are killed in 4 suicide bombings on London Transport, the first Islamist terrorist attack in the UK.
 21 July 2005 London bombings: 4 further attempted bombings on London Transport, without casualties.
 22 July: Jean Charles de Menezes, mistaken for a terrorist suspect, is shot dead by Metropolitan Police officers on a train at Stockwell tube station.
 Summer: Guinness closes its Park Royal brewery.
 5 November: A special £2 coin is released to mark the 400th anniversary of the failed Gunpowder Plot of 1605.
 9 December: Last AEC Routemaster buses in regular service in London are withdrawn.
 The Cathedral of the Dormition of the Most Holy Mother of God and Holy Royal Martyrs (Russian Orthodox Diocese of Great Britain and Ireland) in Chiswick is fully consecrated.
 2006
 20 January: A whale is discovered swimming in the Thames in London.
 25 September: Young's Ram Brewery in Wandsworth closes.
 By October: The Daily Telegraph moves its offices from Canada Place in Canary Wharf (Docklands) to Victoria Plaza near Victoria station in central London.
 1 November: The former Russian spy Alexander Litvinenko is poisoned at the Millennium Hotel, Mayfair by Andrey Lugovoy and Dmitry Kovtun with Polonium-210. He is taken to Barnet Hospital, London before being moved to University College Hospital for intensive care, where he then dies on 23 November. 
 7 December: The London Tornado of 2006 strikes in Kensal Rise.
 Donnybrook Quarter of the East End is completed by Peter Barber Architects.
 Barkers of Kensington is closed down by its owners, House of Fraser.
 2007
 9 March: The rebuilt Wembley Stadium opens.
 29 June: 2 car bombs are uncovered and defused in central London.
 11 November: The London Overground rail franchise begins operation of North London line. This then takes over the East London line in 2010 as well as the Lea Valley lines and the Romford–Upminster line in 2015.
 2008
 16 January: The Rose Theatre, Kingston, opens.
 28 March: Heathrow Terminal 5 opens at the airport.
 April: The Willis Building opens in the City.
 4 May: 2008 London mayoral election: Boris Johnson (Conservative) defeats Ken Livingstone to become Mayor of London.
 30 October: Westfield London shopping centre opens in White City.
 2009
 10 January: The DLR's London City Airport branch begins operation.
 2 February: The February 2009 United Kingdom snowstorm hits London, and Transport for London suspends all London buses.
 March: King's Health Partners is formed as an academic health science centre.
 1–2 April: The 2009 G20 London summit protests takes place, with the 2009 G20 London summit being held at ExCeL London on 2 April.
 3 July: Lakanal House fire: A fire in a 14-storey block of flats in Camberwell (Borough of Southwark) causes 6 fatalities.
 17 September: The Brixton pound local currency is launched.
 12 October: The Evening Standard becomes a free newspaper in central London.
 9 November: Transport for London officially opens its new Surface Transport and Traffic Operations Centre (STTOC) at Palestra, Blackfriars Road to bringing together London Streets Traffic Control Centre (LSTCC), London Buses Command and Control Centre (CentreComm), and the Metropolitan Police Traffic Operation Control Centre (MetroComm).

2010 to 2019 
 2010
 April: HM Prison Isis completed as a young offenders' institution adjacent to HMP Belmarsh in Thamesmead.
 June: The Strata ("The Razor"), whihch is a 148-metre, 43-storey, 408-flat skyscraper at Elephant and Castle in Southwark, that incorporates wind turbines into its structure, is completed.
 30 July: The Barclays Cycle Hire scheme is launched by Boris Johnson, Mayor of London.
 September: The Evelyn Grace Academy, which is a school in Brixton designed by Zaha Hadid, opens. It is then awarded the 2011 Stirling Prize.
 2011
 January: The Heron Tower (110 Bishopsgate) is completed.
 26 March: The 2011 London anti-cuts protest takes place.
 27 March: United Kingdom Census 2011. 22.1% of the London population (1,730,000) have a tongue other than English as their first language, with Polish being the most widely spoken. Statistics also show that the city becomes the 2nd most densely populated city in the UK after Portsmouth in Hampshire.
 29 April: The Wedding of Prince William and Catherine Middleton takes place at Westminster Abbey.
 29 May: The parish church of St John Baptist in Croydon is raised to the honorific status of Croydon Minster.
 4 August: The Death of Mark Duggan, who was shot by the police in Tottenham Hale, triggers the 2011 England riots.
 13 September: Westfield Stratford City shopping mall opens at Stratford.
 15 October: Occupy London begins.
 9 December: Trains on the Circle line (London Underground) cease to run in a complete circle, with trains doing an Edgware Road station loop before going out to Hammersmith Tube station.
 The Georgian Orthodox Cathedral Church of the Nativity of Our Lord is established in the former Agapemonite Ark of the Covenant, which was later known as the Church of the Good Shepherd, in Upper Clapton.
 2012
 3 February: The London Borough of Greenwich becomes the Royal Borough of Greenwich to mark the Diamond Jubilee of Elizabeth II.
 27 February: Transport for London's "New Routemaster" hybrid double-decker buses begin to enter public service.
 30 March: HM Prison Thameside opens.
 3 May: 2012 London Assembly election and 2012 London mayoral election is held, with Conservative candidate Boris Johnson winning his second term.
 3 June: The Thames Diamond Jubilee Pageant takes place.
 4 June: The Diamond Jubilee Concert takes place outside of Buckingham Palace.
 28 June: The Emirates Air Line (cable car) opens across Thames between Royal Docks and Greenwich Peninsula.
 5 July: The Shard skyscraper is inaugurated.
 27 July: The 2012 Summer Olympics begin, based at the Queen Elizabeth Olympic Park in Stratford, lasting until 12 August.
 29 August: The 2012 Summer Paralympics begin, lasting until 9 September.
 10 September: Our Greatest Team Parade is held from Mansion House to Trafalgar Square.
 September: The New College of the Humanities, which is a private university-level institution based in Bedford Square, begins tuition.
 The porters at Billingsgate Fish Market lose their traditional monopoly.
 2013
 March: Regent's College (based in Regent's Park) is granted permission to become Regent's University London, a private charitable institution.
 22 May: Murder of Lee Rigby, a soldier, takes place by 2 Islamic extremists in Woolwich.
 10 September: The Worshipful Company of Educators becomes the 109th livery company of the City of London on being granted livery status by the Court of Aldermen.
 25 October: Lambeth slavery case: 3 women believed to have been held as slaves for the last three decades are rescued from a residence.
 28 October: St. Jude storm takes place, where 2 people are killed in Hounslow.
 13 November: Groundbreaking for the new Embassy of the United States in London takes place in Nine Elms.
 2014
 11 February: The Worshipful Company of Arts Scholars, which was recognised without livery in 2000, is constituted as a livery company of the city.
 April–August: 20 Fenchurch Street (the "Walkie-talkie" office block), which was designed by Rafael Viñoly, completed and occupied in the city.
 July: 122 Leadenhall Street (the "Cheesegrater" office block) opens in the city.
 17 July–11 November: Installation art Blood Swept Lands and Seas of Red in the moat of the Tower of London.
 Burntwood School, Wandsworth, designed by Allford Hall Monaghan Morris, completed; awarded 2015 Stirling Prize.
 Cat Emporium (cat café) in business.
 2015
 January: Earls Court Exhibition Centre dismantling begins.
 2 February: London's population reaches 8,600,000 and is forecast to reach 11,000,000 by 2050.
 1 April: There's an electrical fire under the Kingsway pavement.
 2 April: The Hatton Garden safe deposit burglary begins.
 29 June: Heathrow Terminal 1 closes after nearly 50 years of use to make way for the expansion of Terminal 2.
 2016
 28 January: The Lee Tunnel, which is the first section of the Thames Tideway Scheme, opens.
 23 February: Crossrail is renamed as the Elizabeth line.
 9 May: 2016 London mayoral election: Sadiq Khan (Labour) elected Mayor of London.
 17 June: Tate Modern Switch House (art gallery extension, named the Blavatnik Building in 2017) on Bankside, designed by Herzog & de Meuron, opens.
 1 November: The Metropolitan Police Service returns its headquarters from New Scotland Yard in Broadway to the Curtis Green Building, which is on the original Scotland Yard site.
 24 November
 The Design Museum reopens in the former Commonwealth Institute building in Kensington.
 St. Thomas' Cathedral, Acton opens as Britain's first Syriac Orthodox cathedral in the former St Saviour's Centre for the Deaf.
 2017
 22 February: Cressida Dick is appointed as first woman Commissioner of Police of the Metropolis.
 22 March: 2017 Westminster attack: A lone terrorist causes fatal injuries to 4 pedestrians in a vehicle-ramming attack on Westminster Bridge and fatally stabs a policeman on duty in New Palace Yard before being shot dead by police.
 March: The London and South Coast Rail Corridor Study, which was commissioned by the Department of Transport (DfT), is released and lays out potential plans for Thameslink 2. If approved, this would see improved connectivity for London’s growing economic hub in the Docklands and for Gatwick Airport as well as the growing travel demand between London, Gatwick and the south coast being met. This has an estimated cost of around £10,000,000,000 and would be completed by 2043.
 3 June: The 2017 London Bridge attack takes place, where 3 terrorists cause fatal injuries to 8 people on London Bridge and in Borough Market in a vehicle-ramming attack and stabbings before being shot dead by police.
 14 June: Grenfell Tower fire: A fire engulfs a 24-storey block of flats in North Kensington with 71 fatalities eventually officially confirmed.
 19 June: The Finsbury Park attack takes place, where there is a vehicle-ramming attack on Muslims leaving Tarawih prayer meetings in Finsbury Park with 1 fatality at the scene.
 15 September: The Parsons Green bombing takes place.
 September: A small part of the London Post Office Railway reopens around the Mount Pleasant Sorting Office as part of the Post Office museum in Bloomsbury.
 21 November: St Francis at the Engine Room in Tottenham Hale is the first new purpose-built Anglican parish church in London for 40 years opens, and it is intended as the first of 100 new churches in the diocese.
 18 December: Sarah Mullally is appointed as first woman Bishop of London, who is enthroned 12 May 2018 in St Paul's Cathedral.
 2018
 7 February: Phase 1 of the National Grid's London Power Tunnels are complete, with 32km of tunnels linking electricity substations in Wimbledon and Hackney, are officially opened.
 May: Ravensbourne University London is granted full university status.
 Summer: The heat wave this year causes widespread drought, hosepipe bans, crop failures, and a number of wildfires across the UK, including London.
 November: Extinction Rebellion protests take place across central London.
  24 December: The District line celebrates 150 years of service since first opening as the District Railway.
 2019
 2 April: Plans for London's newest skyscraper, The Tulip, are approved, with work starting as early as 2020 and a scheduled completion date of 2025. These are rejected by Sadiq Khan, Mayor of London on 15th July. 
 3 April: The new Tottenham Hotspur Stadium opens.
 15–26 April: Extinction Rebellion protests across London cause disruption around major tourist areas, including Piccadilly Circus, the Houses of Parliament, Marble Arch and the Stock Exchange.
 10 August: A major power cut hits London and the South-East, with the principal railway termini and TfL network being greatly affected with many severe delays and cancellations.

2020 to 2029 
 2020
 COVID-19 pandemic in London:
 12 February: The first case of COVID-19 in London is confirmed in a woman recently arrived from China. By 17 March, there are almost 500 confirmed cases and 23 deaths. Then on 23 March, London goes into a nationwide lockdown with the rest of the UK.
 3 April: NHS Nightingale Hospital London opens in ExCeL London and remains operational for a month.
 11 April: The number of people with the infection in London hospitals reaches its peak.
 15 October: It's announced that the city is moving to the Tier 2 (high) level of restriction under the first COVID-19 tier regulations in England.
 5 November: The city joins the rest of the UK in a nationwide lockdown that lasts until 2 December in an attempt to reduce the number of cases.
 8 December: 81-year-old Lyn Wheeler is the first person to receive a COVID-19 vaccine at Guy's Hospital outside of trials as a national programme begins rollout.
 15 December: By this date, there have been almost 211,000 confirmed cases and more than 7,400 deaths in London hospitals.
 16 December: The Greater London area and some regions surrounding it move to the Tier 3 (very high) level of restriction under the "all tiers regulations". From 20 December, it moves up to new Tier 4.
 29 July: Brentford F.C. play their last match at Griffin Park before moving to Brentford Community Stadium.
 18 September: The Thameslink Programme, which is an 11-year project to improve the capacity and facilities of the train operating company (TOC) Thameslink, is completed. This saw the major redevelopment of some of the stations along the Thameslink core between St Pancras International and Blackfriars stations, the closure of the Moorgate branch and the platforms at King's Cross station, and the introduction of new and longer trains alongside other major infrastructure work.
 By 31 December: The Greater London Assembly moves from City Hall to The Crystal at Royal Victoria Dock to save on rent.
 2021
 COVID-19 pandemic in London:
 2 January: Schools in London are to remain closed after a government U-turn in their decision to keep Primary schools open.
 4 January: COVID-19 pandemic in London: Prime Minister Boris Johnson announces that London, along with the rest of the UK, will go into a third nationwide lockdown to control the new variants of COVID-19 from 6 January, which will last until at least the Spring.
 8 January: COVID-19 pandemic in London: The Mayor of London declares a 'major incident' as medical services in London face being overwhelmed.
 January: NHS Nightingate Hospital London is returned to operation in ExCel London for recuperating patients, where it then closed again by April this year after cases in London kept dropping.
 22 February: Prime Minister Boris Johnson announces plans to bring the UK, including London, cautiously out of lockdown, with plans for restrictions to be fully lifted by 21 June.
 23 March: London residents commemorate the first anniversary of the COVID-19 lockdown with a candlelight vigil to remember those who lost their lives during the pandemic along with the rest of the UK.
 14 June: Plans to end COVID-19 restrictions are delayed by 4 weeks to 19 July due to a sharp rise of the Delta variant.
 19 July: COVID-19 restrictions in England, including London, come to an end after Prime Minister Boris Johnson confirms this on 12 July.
 1 January: Thousands complain to the BBC that the fireworks and light show on some of London's landmarks to bring in 2021 are too political.
 3 February: Some of London's icons light up the colours of the Union flag to commemorate the death of 100-year-old war veteran Captain Sir Tom Moore, who died on 2 February and raised more than £32 million for the NHS in 2020.
 3 March: 33-year-old Sarah Everard is kidnapped on Clapham Common, with her remains being found a week later in Ashford, Kent. 48-year-old Wayne Couzens, who worked for the Metropolitan Police, is charged with her murder and is found guilty on 9 July before being sentenced to life imprisonment without parole at the Old Bailey on 29 September.
 9 April: Buckingham Palace announces the death of Prince Philip, Duke of Edinburgh in Windsor at the age of 99, and several buildings, including Piccadilly Circus and the BT Tower, light up in black to commemorate his life.
 6 May: The London Mayoral elections take place, with Labour candidate Sadiq Khan winning his second term.
 11 July: The UEFA Euro 2020 Final takes place at Wembley Stadium, with England losing to Italy 3–2 in penalties.
 September and October: Insulate Britain protests: Insulate Britain protesters block various junctions of the M25 motorway (London orbital) multiple times as well as causing chaos across London and the rest of the UK.
 11 September: 67 candles are lit on the 20th anniversary of the 9/11 attacks on the World Trade Center in New York City to remember the 67 British victims who died.
 20 September: The London Underground's Northern line extension to Battersea Power Station via Nine Elms station opens, making it the first new extension on the network since 2008.
 12 October: London's New Year's Eve fireworks display are announced to be cancelled for the second year running.
 28–30 October: The Polar research vessel Sir David Attenborough moors in Greenwich for the COP26 climate change summit taking place in Glasgow.
 11 November: Michael Gove rejects the proposal to build The Tulip skyscraper in the City of London on behalf of the Government.
 8 December: Prime Minister Boris Johnson announces plan B of COVID-19 restrictions due to a sharp increase of the Omicron variant, and Mayor Sadiq Khan declares a 'major incident' in London on 18 December.
 30 December: 2 boys die after being stabbed in separate incidents in London, which brings the total teenage homicides in the capital this year to 30 and surpasses the 2008 peak of 29.
 Uber Boat by Thames Clippers start services towards Gravesend and Tilbury.
 2022
 1 January: After extensive restoration work, Big Ben bongs for the first time in four and a half years alongside the other New Year events to bring in 2022.
 9 January: The Marble Arch Mound closes after a string of controversy and disappointment, and is dismantled in the weeks following.
 15 January: The Bank branch of the Northern Line closes for major upgrade work, which then reopens on 16 May.
 26 January: COVID-19 pandemic in London: Plan B measures for COVID-19 restrictions across the UK, including London, come to an end after Prime Minister Boris Johnson announces this on 18 January following a decline in the Omicron variant.
 10 February: Cressida Dick announces her resignation as Commissioner of Police of the Metropolis just hours after denying her intention of doing so, officially stepping down on 10 April with her replacement to be announced in due course.
 18 February: Part of The O2 Arena's roof is damaged as a result of strong winds during Storm Eunice, where they reach up to 90mph (145kmh). 2 people are also injured by debris in Streatham and Waterloo because of these winds.
 24 February: Prime Minister Boris Johnson removes the last of the COVID-19 restrictions (compulsory isolation with a positive test) in London and the rest of the UK.
 26 February: Some of London's icons light up in the colours of the flag of Ukraine in response to the Russian invasion a few days prior.
 6 March: Queen Elizabeth II permanently moves from Buckingham Palace to Windsor Castle.
 8 March: Ukraine's President Volodymyr Zelensky becomes the first foreign leader to directly address MP's at Westminster in a virtual address.
 21 March: A thanksgiving ceremony takes place in Westminster Abbey in memory of the late Vera Lynn.
 29 March: A thanksgiving ceremony takes place in Westminster Abbey in memory of the late Prince Philip, Duke of Edinburgh.
 30 March: Large areas of London suffer from a power cut due to a sub-station catching fire.
 16 April: Extinction Rebellion protests take place across central London.
 26 April: The Thames Clippers start using Barking Riverside pier, with the branch line of the London Overground from Barking to Barking Riverside station via Renwick Road station fully opening on 18 July.
 24 May: The central section of Crossrail/the Elizabeth line between Paddington and Abbey Wood officially opens after many years of delays and a massive overbudget.
 1 June-18 September: Over 20,000,000 seeds are sown in the moat of the Tower of London for the Superbloom exhibition as part of the Platinum Jubilee of Elizabeth II. On 28 October, the Tower of London announces that the flowers will return in the summer of 2023 due to its success this year.
 2–5 June: The Platinum Jubilee of Elizabeth II is celebrated with a bank holiday weekend, events around Buckingham Palace, and street parties across London and the rest of the UK.
 5 June: A man dies after falling into the Thames after being tasered by the police on Chelsea Bridge.
 26 June: The 1972 tube stock reaches 50 years of service on the Bakerloo line, making them the oldest trains on not only the London Underground, but also on the UK railway network.
 28 June: The Metropolitan Police is subjected to an advanced level of monitoring, which is a form of special measures, by HM Inspectorate of Constabulary.
 Summer: A heat wave affects London and the rest of the UK:
 19 July: The UK's temperature reaches 40°C (104°F) at Heathrow Airport for the first time in the country's and city's history. Also for the first time its history, London is one of the hottest places on Earth, with major fires breaking out across outer London.
 22 July: A cooling system trial for the deepest Tube lines, which is set up at the abandoned platform at Holborn tube station, begins in response to the extreme heat.
 4 August: The source of the River Thames, which is located near Cirencester, Gloucestershire, dries up for the first time in its history.
 12 August: A drought is officially declared in the south of England, including London, during the second heatwave of this year, with a hosepipe ban coming in on 24 August.
 2 July: Over 1,000,000 people attend the LGBT Pride march to celebrate the 50th anniversary of Pride London, which closely follows the original 1972 route and is the largest turnout in the event's history.
 7 July: The July 2022 United Kingdom government crisis takes place, where Boris Johnson resigns as Prime Minister of the United Kingdom after more than 20 government ministers resign following Partygate and other matters. Liz Truss is announced as the new Prime Minister on 5 September.
 12 July: An electrical fire breaks out under Regent Street, which is extinguished around an hour after the first calls come in.
 18 July: Barking Riverside station opens a few months ahead of schedule, making it the first extension on the London Overground since 2015.
 20 July: A flat in Woolwich and near London City Airport catches fire, and over 100 firefighters are called.
 31 July: At the UEFA Women’s Euro 2022 final in Wembley Stadium, England beat Germany 2-1 during extra time to win this year's competition. On 1 August, their victory parade takes place from their hotel in Teddington to Trafalgar Square.
 7 August: Around 70 firefighters battle a huge fire that breaks out near Heathrow Airport after an ‘explosion’ was heard. Although some flights are diverted, there is no serious damage to any property.
 8-12 August: The Swedish sailing ship Göteborg, which is the world's largest ocean-going wooden sailing ship, visits London as part of the history of the East India Companies and the adventures of the original ship exhibition.
 11 August: Children between the ages of 1 and 9 are offered a polio vaccine after 116 samples of the vaccine-like poliovirus were detected in the sewage water in 8 of London's boroughs between February and July of this year.
 17 August: A fire near London Bridge station severely disrupts rail services in the area.
 1 September: The Swedish technology firm IFS is announced as the new sponsor for the London Cable Car, which will start from October.
 3 September: A tribute concert for Taylor Hawkins of the Foo Fighters takes place at Wembley Stadium.
 8 September: Buckingham Palace announces the death of Queen Elizabeth II at Balmoral Castle at the age of 96, with Charles, Prince of Wales succeeding her to become King Charles III. Various buildings across London, including the BT Tower, light up in black to commemorate her life, several memorials are set up around the city, and in the days following, tributes from world leaders pour in. Charles also becomes the oldest person in British history to come to the throne as the monarch at age 73.
 19 September: The funeral procession of Queen Elizabeth II takes place from the Palace of Westminster to Wellington Arch.
 24 September: At dusk, over 150 boats decorated with white lights celebrate the Platinum Jubilee of Elizabeth II on the river as part of the Totally Thames festival.
 September to late 2023: Victoria station undergoes a £30,000,000 renovation to improve station capacity alongside resignalling work.
 14 October: The shopping centre inside the renovated Battersea Power Station opens nearly 40 years after it was decommissioned, with a food hall expected to open in 2023.
 20 October: Liz Truss resigns as Prime Minister after just 44 days, making her the shortest serving Prime Minister in UK history. Rishi Sunak then replaces her on 25 October.
 30 October: Just Stop Oil protestors block Charing Cross Road, Kensington High Street, Harleyford Street, and Blackfriars Road demanding that the goernment halt oil licenses. On 31 October, a judge orders 180 protesters to stop blocking these roads.
 1 November: Plans are announced for the Wonder of Friendship exhibition to take place in London in May 2023 to celebrate the 100th anniversary of Walt Disney Pictures.
 2 November: A fully electric version of the Boris Routemaster bus is unveiled by Transport for London (TfL), with passengers expected to travel on it by December.
 6 November: The Elizabeth line connects its central section to the rest of its network to provide a direct service from Reading and Heathrow Airport in the west to Shenfield and Abbey Wood in the east. Bond Street station opened on 24 October, and a peak service of 24 trains per hour at Whitechapel will be introduced by May 2023 to fully complete the project 14 years after its construction began.
 9 November: Nurses in some of London's major hospitals vote to strike around Christmas, making it their first strike since 1916.
 10 November: Greenwich Park announces plans to restore a set of giant grass steps dating back to the 17th century as part of a wider restoration project, which is due to be completed in 2025.
 16 November: Gravesend's town pier, which is the oldest surviving cast iron pier in the world, is purchased by Uber Boat by Thames Clippers, with planes to establish a ferry service by 2025.
 18 November: Plans to move the Billingsgate Fish Market and Smithfield Meat Market to a new site in Dagenham are approved by the City of London, with plans to open them between 2027 and 2028.
 4 December: The Museum of London closes its doors for the last time before its move to its new location in Smithfield as The London Museum.
 11/12 December: Heavy snowfall during the night causes chaos on London's transport system in the days following, with numerous cancellations on the railways, Tube, and buses.
 14 December: The pedestrianisation of The Strand is completed and opened for public use.
 December: Floods across London due to the snow cause hundreds of people to evacuate, which then continues into January 2023.
 London's mainline railway services are affected during the National Union of Rail, Maritime and Transport Workers (RMT) rail strikes throughout this year.
 2023
 1 January: The New Year fireworks return to London after being cancelled for 2 years due to COVID-19.
 10 January: Transport for London (TfL) announce a series of activites throughout 2023 to celebrate the 160th anniversary of the London Underground. Mayor Sadiq Khan also meets up with 4 employees of TfL who have a combined total of 160 years of service.
 26 January: The church of St Mark, Hamilton Terrace in St John's Wood is gutted by fire.
 13 February: The long-running London bus drivers' dispute ends after an 18% pay deal is agreed on.
 London's mainline railway services continue to be affected during the National Union of Rail, Maritime and Transport Workers (RMT) rail strikes continue into this year.
 2026 – Projected:
 The Museum of London reopens as The London Museum in Smithfield.

See also
 Timeline of London
 History of London

References

Bibliography

See also lists of works about London by period: Tudor London, Stuart London, 18th century, 19th century, 1900–1939, 1960s
published in the 19th century
 
 
 
 
 
 
 
 
 
 
  circa 1882
 
 

published in the 20th century
 
 
 

 
 
 
 
 
 

published in the 21st century

External links

 British History Online. London
 
 
 .
 Europeana. Items related to London, various dates.
 Digital Public Library of America. Items related to London, various dates
 

London
London-related lists

london
London